Sonkatch Assembly constituency is one of the 230 Vidhan Sabha (Legislative Assembly) constituencies of Madhya Pradesh state in central India.

It is in Dewas district, and is a segment of the Dewas Lok Sabha constituency.

Members of Legislative Assembly
1957: Bhagirathsingh Puransingh: BJS
1962: Bhagirath Singh: JS
1964(bypoll): V. Singh: JS
1967: Khoobchand: BJS
1972: Bapulal Kishanlal, INC
1977: Devilal Raikwal Bulchand: JNP
1980: Bapulal Kishan Lal Malviya, INC(I)
1985: Sajjan Singh Verma, INC
1990: Kailash: BJP
1993: Surender Verma,: BJP
1998: Sajjan Singh Verma, INC
2003: Sajjan Singh Verma, INC
2008: Sajjan Singh Verma, INC
2013: Rajendra Phulchand Verma : BJP

References

Assembly constituencies of Madhya Pradesh
Dewas district